

127001–127100 

|-id=005
| 127005 Pratchett ||  || Terry Pratchett (1948–2015), English author known for his comic fantasy book series, Discworld || 
|-id=030
| 127030 Herrington ||  || John Herrington (born 1958) is a former NASA astronaut and a member of the Chickasaw Nation. Herrington was a mission specialist for the 16th space shuttle flight to the International Space Station and he performed three space walks during the mission. || 
|}

127101–127200 

|-id=196
| 127196 Hanaceplechová || 2002 HH || Hana Ceplechová (born 1945), long-time secretary in the Interplanetary Matter Department of the Ondrejov Observatory in the Czech Republic || 
|}

127201–127300 

|-bgcolor=#f2f2f2
| colspan=4 align=center | 
|}

127301–127400 

|-bgcolor=#f2f2f2
| colspan=4 align=center | 
|}

127401–127500 

|-id=477
| 127477 Fredalee ||  || Freda Denham Lee (1914–1991) was a highly regarded teacher; her career spanned the dawn of the Space Age. Though not trained in science, her science-minded students found a tireless mentor who effectively guided independent explorations. She gifted such students fulfilling science and engineering careers. || 
|}

127501–127600 

|-id=515
| 127515 Nitta ||  || Atsuko Nitta (born 1966), Japanese-American astronomer with the Sloan Digital Sky Survey || 
|-id=516
| 127516 Oravetz ||  || Daniel Oravetz (born 1984), American astronomer with the Sloan Digital Sky Survey || 
|-id=517
| 127517 Kaikepan ||  || Kaike Pan (born 1965), Chinese-American astronomer with the Sloan Digital Sky Survey || 
|-id=545
| 127545 Crisman ||  || James R. Crisman (born 1937), president of the Astronomy Club of Sun City West in Arizona and supporter of the Lowell Observatory || 
|}

127601–127700 

|-id=689
| 127689 Doncapone ||  || Don Giuseppe Capone (1922–2009), Italian cleric, archeoastronomer, and scholar of the origins of the city of Alatri (Aletrium) and rector of the diocesan Seminar || 
|}

127701–127800 

|-bgcolor=#f2f2f2
| colspan=4 align=center | 
|}

127801–127900 

|-id=803
| 127803 Johnvaneepoel ||  || John M. Van Eepoel (born 1977), contributor to the OSIRIS-REx asteroid sample-return mission and to its navigation and flight dynamics team || 
|-id=810
| 127810 Michaelwright ||  || Michael Wright (born 1960) is the project lead for assembly, test, and launch operations for the OSIRIS-REx asteroid sample-return mission. He is also an exploration systems engineer, developing concepts for human exploration of Mars. He served as an integration and test manager for over a dozen missions including FREESTAR on the final flight of space shuttle Columbia || 
|-id=870
| 127870 Vigo ||  || Vigo, Galicia, Spain, the first discoverer's birthplace || 
|}

127901–128000 

|-id=933
| 127933 Shaunoborn ||  || Shaun Oborn (born 1964), member of the "Solo Effects LLC" team and contributor to the OSIRIS-REx asteroid sample-return mission working and its navigation and flight dynamics team || 
|-id=935
| 127935 Reedmckenna ||  || Reed McKenna (born 1959), member of the "Solo Effects LLC" team and contributor to the OSIRIS-REx asteroid sample-return mission working and its navigation and flight dynamics team || 
|}

References 

127001-128000